Wacouta is an unincorporated community in Wacouta Township, Goodhue County, Minnesota, United States.

The community is located southeast of Red Wing along Highways 61 and 63.  Bullard Creek flows through the community, with the Mississippi River and Lake Pepin located nearby.

Nearby places include Red Wing, Frontenac, Hay Creek, and Lake City.

References

Unincorporated communities in Minnesota
Unincorporated communities in Goodhue County, Minnesota